Adrien Goffinet (Neufchâteau, 10 April 1812 – Brussels, 21 December 1886)

Baron Adrien Goffinet senior was one of the most trusted dignitaries at the Belgian court. His father Adrien Goffinet was made the knighthood of Leopold granted by royal decree in 1833, following a brilliant military career. After his military career he was sent in 1839 to the Hague, where he was asked by the Belgian commission to form the new Belgian borders.
One of his most important missions was to bring the empress dowager Charlotte from Miramare to her brother Leopold II in Belgium. Leopold asked to escort his wife Queen Marie Henriette to the Viennese Court. The queen was the niece of emperor Franz-Josef I of Austria. Charlotte was kept in Miramare under the close supervision of Count de Bombelles.

He was the father of Auguste Goffinet.

Honours 
  : Created Baron Goffinet by Royal Decree of 15.3.1867.
  : Grand cordon of the Order of Leopold
  : Knight Grand cross in the Order of the Crown
 Knight Grand Cross in the Royal Order of Saint Michael
 Knight Grand Cross in the Order of the Lion and the Sun
 Knight Grand Cross in the Most Exalted Order of the White Elephant
 Knight Grand Cross in the House Order of Saxe-Ernestine
 Officer in the Order of the Netherlands Lion
 Officier in the Legion of Honour
 Knight in the Order of Franz Joseph

References

Dignitaries of the Belgian court
Barons of Belgium
1812 births
1886 deaths